Babylon Project may refer to:
 The Babylon Project, a FreeSpace 2 Source Code Project
 A fictional space station construction program in the Babylon 5 television series
 Project Babylon, an Iraqi weapons program
 A fictional construction project involving the filling in of Tokyo Bay in the Patlabor series
 The Babylon Project, a 2002 foundation established by Alexey Kuzmichev to preserve Iraqi antiquities